Enoch Matlack House is a historic home located at Hummelstown, Dauphin County, Pennsylvania.  It was built in 1872, and is a -story, "T"-shaped brick building, with a two-story rear section.  It has a cross-gable roof.  On each side of the rear section are second story balconies.  A porch is along the front and east facades.

It was added to the National Register of Historic Places in 1979.

References

Houses on the National Register of Historic Places in Pennsylvania
Houses completed in 1872
Houses in Dauphin County, Pennsylvania
National Register of Historic Places in Dauphin County, Pennsylvania